Skaugen is a surname. Notable people with the surname include:

Brynjulf Skaugen, Sr. (1918–2002), Norwegian businessman
Grace Reksten Skaugen (born 1953), Norwegian business executive
Isak Martinius Skaugen (1875–1962), Norwegian businessman
Morits Skaugen (1920–2005), Norwegian yacht racer and businessman
Morits Skaugen, Jr. (born 1955), Norwegian businessman

See also
I. M. Skaugen, a Norwegian shipping company